The simple-station Museo del Oro is part of the TransMilenio mass-transit system of Bogotá, Colombia, opened in the year 2000.

Location
The station is located in the very heart of Bogotá. It is located on Avenida Jiménez just five meters from Carrera Séptima. The station is situated between the television studios of Citytv to the south and the headquarters of Banco de la República to the north. Also nearby is the Iglesia de San Francisco (to the west), the Plazoleta del Rosario and the Universidad del Rosario

History
The Eje Ambiental line of the TransMilenio was opened in 2002, which include Las Aguas, Avenida Jiménez, and this station.

The station is named for the Museo del Oro, which is located 150 meters away.

Station services

Old trunk services

Main line service

Note: the station does not provide service on Sundays and holidays.

Feeder routes
This station does not have connections to feeder routes.

Inter-city service
This station does not have inter-city service.

See also
 Bogotá
 TransMilenio
 List of TransMilenio Stations

External links

 TransMilenio

TransMilenio